Ferdinando Scarfiotti (6 March 1941 – 30 April 1994) was an Italian art director and production designer. 

After graduating in architecture at the University of Rome, he was approached by Luchino Visconti, who asked him to design his stage production of La Traviata for the 1963 Spoleto Festival. After working in opera theatre for over a decade, director Bernardo Bertolucci asked Scarfiotti to work with him on the film The Conformist followed by Visconti's Death in Venice. In 1980 he moved to Los Angeles, where he worked on a number of films, including American Gigolo (1980), Cat People (1982) and Scarface (1983).

Scarfiotti won a Bafta for Visconti's Death in Venice in 1971 and an Academy Award in the category Best Art Direction for the film The Last Emperor in 1987.

Selected filmography
 Death in Venice (1971)
Daisy Miller (1974)
 American Gigolo (1980)
 Cat People (1982)
 Scarface (1983) 
 The Last Emperor (1987)
Fair Game (1988)
 The Sheltering Sky (1990)
 Toys (1992)

See also
 Art Directors Guild Hall of Fame

References

External links

1941 births
1994 deaths
Italian art directors
People from the Province of Macerata
Best Art Direction Academy Award winners
Best Production Design BAFTA Award winners
Italian production designers
David di Donatello winners
Ciak d'oro winners